The 1804 United States elections elected the members of the 9th United States Congress. The election took place during the First Party System. The Democratic-Republican Party continued its control of the Presidency and both houses of Congress.

In the Presidential election, incumbent Democratic-Republican President Thomas Jefferson easily defeated Federalist former Governor Charles Pinckney of South Carolina. As the Twelfth Amendment had been ratified in 1804, this was the first election in which electors separately selected a president and a vice president.

In the House, Democratic-Republicans won moderate gains, boosting their already-dominant majority.

In the Senate, Democratic-Republicans made small gains, improving on their commanding majority.

See also
1804 United States presidential election
1804–05 United States House of Representatives elections
1804–05 United States Senate elections
1804 United States gubernatorial elections

References

1804 elections in the United States
1804